Oru Nadigaiyin Vaakkumoolam is a 2012 Indian Tamil-language drama film, written and directed by Rajkrishna. The film stars Sonia Agarwal, with Kabil, Sathan, Urmila Unni, Rajkapoor, Kovai Sarala, and Ganja Karuppu in supporting roles. The music for the film was composed by Aathish with cinematography by Naga Krishnan and editing by B. S. Vasu. The film opened to negative reviews upon its released on 10 February 2012.

Plot 
The movie begins with a scribe named Rita searching for the actress Anjali. Anjali had disappeared after being a famous heroine. All searches to find this actress ended up as a failure. After the journalist finds her after many feats of hardships, there is a flashback revealing Anjali's travails. Being the daughter of a poor folk artiste named Devarajulu, her mother has been going to places to make her daughter an actress and reached Kodambakkam. After painfully climbing stairs and being rejected in every studio in Kodambakkam and Vadapalani, they agree on casting couch unhappily. However, Anjali gets her heroine role and makes it her debut after a compromise. This leads to a greed change in her mother to get money and leaves her in debt. After being humiliated by people in the industry exploiting her, she takes one of the film's extreme decisions. Thus, her discussions and other events lead up to the climax of the movie.

Cast

 Sonia Agarwal as Anjali
 Urmila Unni as Girija
 Kovai Sarala as Papi
 Ganja Karuppu as Arokkiyasamy
 Raj Kapoor as Director
 Sathan
 Kabil
 Nickol
 Manobala
 Jyothi Lakshmi
 Robert
 Yogi Devaraj as Devarajulu
 Sukran as Datchinamurthy
 Boys Rajan as SG TV Channel MD
 Veyil Venkatesan
 Velmurugan
 Muthukaalai
 Punnagai Poo Gheetha as Rita (cameo appearance)
 Radha Krishnan in a special appearance
 Jithan Ramesh as himself (special appearance)
 Vikraman as himself (special appearance)
 A. Venkatesh as himself (special appearance)
 Suraj as himself (special appearance)

Production
Rajkrishna chose to make a film focussing on the life of an actress and the downfall of her career, and approached Sonia Agarwal to enact the lead character. Sonia accepted to work on the film after relating to script, stating that she also went through certain hardships during her time as an actress and lost weight to star in the film. The actress however clarified to the media before release that the film was not based on her life or any other actress's life.

The success of the Hindi film, The Dirty Picture (2011), which was based on the same theme, created extra publicity for the film. Impressed with Sonia's performance during the shoot, Rajkrishna signed her on for his next film too, titled Achchamenna with Jithan Ramesh, but the film eventually did not materialise.

Soundtrack
Soundtrack was composed by Aatish.
"Moondram Jenmam" - Anandhan, Anuradha Sriram
"Vaanavil Idho" - Vinitha
"Kaalai Sooriyan" - Ranjith
"Cinema Cinema" - Mano

Release
The film opened to negative reviews in February 2012, with Behindwoods.com giving the film 1.5 out of 5 stars calling it a "pensive account". A critic from Sify.com noted "the narrative style is outdated, the proceedings are disjointed and the screenplay lacks any coherence or logic" and added "a theme that had the potential to be an engrossing tale turns out to be a dull fare with diluted and archaic approach". A second critic from Sify.com noted that "a premise that has to be insightful, dark and disturbing falls flat with an amateurish direction, jarring music and background score, wrong supporting cast, tacky production values and an old fashioned presentation". Likewise, The Hindu also gave the film a negative review, concluding the "script is weak and the dialogues repetitive".

References

External links
 

2012 films
2010s Tamil-language films
Films about women in India
Indian feminist films
Films about filmmaking
Films about actors
2012 directorial debut films